CDAC may refer to:
Commission on Dental Accreditation of Canada
Communicating with Disaster Affected Communities Network
Canadian American Railroad
Centre for Development of Advanced Computing
 Chinese Development Assistance Council, a self-help and non-profit organization set up by the Chinese community in Singapore to help the lower-income group and academically-weak students